Lee Jay-hyun (born March 19, 1960) is a South Korean businessman. He is the chairman of the CJ Group.

Biography 
Lee was born in 1960 as the eldest grandson of the late Samsung founder Lee Byung-chul. His father, Lee Maeng-hee, was the eldest son of Lee Byung-chul who was pushed out of competition in a power struggle with his younger brother and late Samsung Chairman Lee Kun-hee.

Lee went to Kyungbock High School and received his bachelor's degree from Korea University. He started his career at Citibank in 1983, and joined the family business at CheilJedang in 1985 at the request of his grandfather. He briefly held positions at Samsung Electronics before taking over the helm of CJ Group in the late 1990s after it was spun off from Samsung Group. He is credited for turning the company into the South Korea's 13th-largest conglomerate.

In 2014, Lee was sentenced to jail for four years and a fine of 26 billion won for tax evasion and embezzlement. He was pardoned by South Korean President Park Geun-hye in 2016.

As of 2021, his net worth stands at US$1.34 billion, making him the country's 37th richest person.

Personal life 
Lee married Kim Heui-jae in 1984 and has one son, Lee Sun-ho, and one daughter, Lee Kyeong-hoo, both of whom graduated from Columbia University. He endowed the Lee Family Scholarship at Columbia College.

References 

1960 births
Living people
South Korean businesspeople
South Korean billionaires
CJ Group
Kyungbock High School alumni
Korea University alumni
Citigroup employees
Samsung people
Lee family (South Korea)
20th-century South Korean businesspeople
21st-century South Korean businesspeople